Consort Jiang may refer to:

Queen Jiang ( 9th or 8th century BC), consort of King Xuan of Zhou
Jiang Jiangui ( 470s), wife of Emperor Houfei of Liu Song
Jiang Caipin, likely fictional concubine of Emperor Xuanzong of Tang